Scabricola caerulea is a species of sea snail, a marine gastropod mollusc in the family Mitridae, the miters or miter snails.

Description

Distribution
This marine species occurs off the Philippines.

References

 Drivas, J.; Jay, M. (1987). Coquillages de La Réunion et de l'Île Maurice. Collection Les Beautés de la Nature. Delachaux et Niestlé: Neuchâtel. . 159 pp.
 Cernohorsky W.O. (1991). The Mitridae of the world. Part 2. The subfamily Mitrinae concluded and subfamilies Imbricariinae and Cylindromitrinae. Monographs of Marine Mollusca. 4: ii + 164 pp.
 Poppe G.T. & Tagaro S.P. (2008). Mitridae. pp. 330–417, in: G.T. Poppe (ed.), Philippine marine mollusks, volume 2. Hackenheim: ConchBooks. 848 pp.

External links
 Reeve L.A. (1844-1845). Monograph of the genus Mitra. In: Conchologia Iconica, vol. 2, pl. 1-39 and unpaginated text. L. Reeve & Co.
 Fedosov A., Puillandre N., Herrmann M., Kantor Yu., Oliverio M., Dgebuadze P., Modica M.V. & Bouchet P. (2018). The collapse of Mitra: molecular systematics and morphology of the Mitridae (Gastropoda: Neogastropoda). Zoological Journal of the Linnean Society. 183(2): 253-337

Mitridae
Gastropods described in 1844